Arnaud-Guilhem is a commune in the Haute-Garonne department in southwestern France.

Population

See also
Communes of the Haute-Garonne department

References
http://www.arnaud-guilhem.fr/

Communes of Haute-Garonne